Washington Omar Aguerre Lima (born 23 April 1993) is a Uruguayan professional footballer who plays as a goalkeeper.

Club career
A youth academy product of Peñarol, Aguerre made his professional debut on 31 August 2014 in a 2–0 win against Tacuarembó.

On 10 October 2019, he scored his first career goal in Cerro Largo's 2–0 win against Cerro.

International career
Aguerre is a former Uruguay youth international. His only match for under-20 team was on 13 June 2013 against El Salvador. He was team's third-choice goalkeeper behind Guillermo de Amores and Jonathan Cubero during 2013 FIFA U-20 World Cup and 2013 South American Youth Football Championship.

References

External links
 

1993 births
Living people
Uruguayan footballers
Association football goalkeepers
Uruguayan Primera División players
Peñarol players
Cerro Largo F.C. players
Plaza Colonia players